is a Japanese manga series written and illustrated by Gido Amagakure. It has been serialized in Kodansha's seinen manga magazine Good! Afternoon since April 2020. An anime television series adaptation by Asahi Production and a television drama adaptation are set to premiere in April 2023.

Characters

Media

Manga
A Galaxy Next Door, written and illustrated by Gido Amagakure, started in Kodansha's seinen manga magazine Good! Afternoon on April 7, 2020. Kodansha has collected its chapters into individual tankōbon volumes. The first volume was released on November 6, 2020. As of November 7, 2022, five volumes have been released.

In June 2021, Kodansha USA announced the English release of the manga in North America, starting in 2022.

Volume list

Drama
In January 2023, television drama adaptation was announced, with Yoshihito Okashita, Izuru Kumasaka, Masayuki Kokuryō serving as directors. It is set to premiere on NHK on April 3, 2023.

Anime
In April 2022, it was announced that the series will receive an anime television series adaptation. It is produced by Asahi Production and directed by Ryuichi Kimura, with scripts written by Gigaemon Ichikawa, and character designs handled by Fuyuka Ōtaki. The series is set to premiere on April 9, 2023, on Tokyo MX and BS11. Crunchyroll licensed the series outside of Asia.

See also
Sweetness and Lightning, another manga series by the same author

Notes

References

External links
 
 

2023 anime television series debuts
2023 Japanese television series debuts
Anime series based on manga
Asahi Production
Crunchyroll anime
Kodansha manga
Manga adapted into television series
Manga creation in anime and manga
NHK television dramas
Romantic comedy anime and manga
Seinen manga
Tokyo MX original programming